In My Arms is the twenty third studio album released by American country artist Crystal Gayle. The album was released on October 31, 2000 via Madacy Entertainment. It was Gayle's first and only studio album consisting of children's music.

Background and reception
In My Arms was recorded in 2000. The album was produced by Steve Ivey and Denny Jiosa. This was the first collaboration between Gayle and the producers. The album was also Gayle's first album of children's music. The album contains a variety of children's songs, including lullabies. Among the album's lullabies are "Crystal Moon" and "The Last Ray of Sunshine".

The album was released on October 31, 2000 via Madacy Entertainment. In My Arms was reviewed by Allmusic's Rick Cohoon, who gave the release 3.5 of 5 stars. Cohoon praised Gayle's voice, calling it "soothing" and "rich". He concluded by saying, "You won't find dancing purple dinosaurs here, but what you will find is comfort and peace...whether you are three or 103."

Track listing
All songs composed by Steve Ivey and Denny Jiosa.

Personnel
All credits are adapted from Allmusic.

Musicians
 Charles Cochran – piano
 Eric Darken – percussion
 Ellen Dockery – background vocals
 Hollie Farris – flugelhorn
 Crystal Gayle – lead vocals
 Jim Hoke – saxophone
 Steve Ivey – accordion, keyboards, guitar, percussion
 Denny Jiosa – guitar, keyboards, mandolin, percussion
 Chris Kent – bass
 Tim Lauer – accordion
 Jeff Lisenby – accordion
 Jay Patten – saxophone
 Tom Reynolds – keyboards
 Reggie Smith – background vocals
 Gary Tussing – cello

Creative
 Kisa Kavass – cover photo
 Ingrid Stockbauer – cover design

Technical
 Steve Ivey – producer
 Denny Jiosa – producer
 Ken Love – mastering

References

Crystal Gayle albums
2000 albums
Children's music albums
Children's music albums by American artists